Glelberson Luís Leopoldino Bertante (born September 14, 1986 in Matias Barbosa), or simply Luís Gueguel, is a Brazilian football striker. His younger sister Gabriela Bertante has appeared in Indian regional films.

External links
Guardian Stats Centre
sambafoot
 CBF
 palmeiras.globo.com

1986 births
Living people
Sportspeople from Minas Gerais
Brazilian footballers
Tupi Football Club players
Esporte Clube Noroeste players
América Futebol Clube (SP) players
Rio Branco Esporte Clube players
Sociedade Esportiva Palmeiras players
Ituano FC players
Esporte Clube Juventude players
Grêmio Barueri Futebol players
Boavista Sport Club players
Clube Atlético Bragantino players
Association football forwards